The Robert Atlas Harper House is a historic house at 201 North Main Street in Greenwood, Arkansas.  Built about 1915, the house is a little-altered American Foursquare with a distinctive exterior made of a rough stone aggregate mixed with cement, creating a tabby-like rough stucco finish.  Its front porch is also uniquely designed, with tapered square piers out of battered stone set atop a half-wall of the same material.  The house was built by W. Calvin Stanfill, a local contractor who specialized in stone masonry work.

The house was listed on the National Register of Historic Places in 2000.

See also
National Register of Historic Places listings in Sebastian County, Arkansas

References

Houses on the National Register of Historic Places in Arkansas
Houses completed in 1915
Houses in Sebastian County, Arkansas
National Register of Historic Places in Sebastian County, Arkansas